Glasgow Airport is the primary airport serving Glasgow, Scotland, United Kingdom.

Glasgow Airport may also refer to:

Canada
Rodney (New Glasgow) Airport, in Rodney, Ontario

United Kingdom
Glasgow Prestwick Airport, in South Ayrshire, a secondary airport serving Glasgow, Scotland
Glasgow (Renfrew) Airport, also known as RAF Renfrew, the predecessor of Glasgow International Airport
Glasgow Seaplane Terminal, in Glasgow, Scotland

United States
Glasgow Airport (Montana), also known as Wokal Field, in Glasgow, Montana
Glasgow Air Force Base, a former United States Air Force base near Glasgow, Montana
Glasgow Industrial Airport, a private airport located on the site of the former Glasgow Air Force Base near Glasgow, Montana
Glasgow Municipal Airport, in Kentucky